Acmanthina albipuncta is a species of moth of the family Tortricidae. It is found in Ñuble Region, Chile and in Argentina.

References

Moths described in 2000
Euliini
Moths of South America